Edgar Gabriel Balbuena Adorno or, simply, Edgar Balbuena (born 20 November 1980 in Capiatá) is a Paraguayan footballer. He currently plays for Juan Aurich in the Peruvian Primera Division.

External links
 
 Argentine Primera statistics  

1980 births
Living people
People from Capiatá
Paraguayan footballers
Paraguayan expatriate footballers
Cerro Porteño players
Estudiantes de La Plata footballers
Club Olimpia footballers
Club Libertad footballers
Sport Club Corinthians Paulista players
Juan Aurich footballers
C.S.D. Independiente del Valle footballers
Argentine Primera División players
Peruvian Primera División players
Expatriate footballers in Argentina
Expatriate footballers in Brazil
Expatriate footballers in Peru
Expatriate footballers in Colombia
Association football defenders